Adam Browne (born 1963) is an Australian speculative fiction writer. He lives in Melbourne, Australia. Browne illustrates his own work.

Bibliography

Books 
 Pyrotechnicon: Being a True Account of the Further Adventures of Cyrano de Bergerac Among the States and Empires of the Stars, by Himself (dec'd) – Coeur de Lion Publishing (Australia), 2012
 "Other Stories," and Other Stories – Satalyte (Australia), 2014
 The Tame Animals of Saturn - Peggy Bright Books (Australia), 2016

Short fiction 
"Orlando's Third Trance" -HQ Magazine (Australia), 1999 
"Account Dracula" -Orb Magazine (Australia), 1999 
"Rococo Cola" -Orb Magazine (Australia), 2000 
"Schrödinger's Catamaran" -Orb Magazine (Australia), 2000, 
"The Weatherboard Spaceship" – Aurealis Magazine (Australia), 2001 
"Widow City" -Ideomancer (US), 2001 
"Nativity Plague" -Aurealis Magazine (Australia), 2001 
"Les Autres" -Ideomancer (US), 2002 
"Ad Nauseam" -NFG Magazine (Canada), 2002 
"Captain Thankless" -Ideomancer Unbound speculative fiction anthology (US), 2002 
"The End of Roentgen Rays" -Talebones Science Fiction Magazine (US), 2002  
"Zombiewaffe" -NFG Magazine (Canada), 2003 
"Space Operetta" -Aurealis Magazine (Australia), 2003 
"Exterminator Rex" -Agog! Science Fiction Anthology (Australia), 2003 
"The Old Man and the Sun" -NFG Magazine (Canada), 2003 
"The Nativity Plague" (republished) -Nowa Fantastyka (Poland), 2004 
"Ringcycle" (co-written with John Dixon) -Aurealis Magazine (Australia), 2004 
"Blood Drunk" -NFG Magazine (Canada), 2004 
"Ringcycle" (co-written with John Dixon) -Aurealis Magazine (Australia), 2004 
"Heart of Saturday Night" -Lenox Ave Magazine (US), 2005
 "Sun King" -Andromeda Spaceways Inflight Magazine (Australia), 2006 
 "Obituary Boy" (with John Dixon) -Andromeda Spaceways Inflight Magazine (Australia), 2006
 "Blood Drunk" Cardigan Press Anthology (Australia), 2006
 "Postdiluvian" Aurealis Magazine (Australia), 2006
 "Heart of Saturday Night" (republished) Australian Dark Fantasy and Horror: the Best of 2005, Edited by Angela Challis & Shane Jiraiya Cummings (Brimstone Press, 2006)
 "Neverland Blues" – Dreaming Again (Australia), 2009
 "The Dd" – Light Touch Paper, Stand Clear, Peggy Bright Books (Australia), 2013

Awards

Chronos Award
 "Neverland Blues", received the Chronos award for best Australian sf short story (2009)

Aurealis Award
 "Heart of Saturday Night" shortlisted for Aurealis Award for best Australian fantasy short story (2006)
 "The Weatherboard Spaceship" winner of the Aurealis award for best Australian sf short story (2002)
 "Schrödinger's Catamaran" shortlisted for Aurealis award for best Australian sf short story (2001)
 "Orlando's Third Trance" shortlisted for Aurealis award for best Australian fantasy story. (2000)

References

External links

Adam Browne's blog

Living people
1963 births
Australian science fiction writers
Australian fantasy writers
Writers from Melbourne